"Raised on Rock'" is a 1973 song by Elvis Presley. It was written for him by Mark James, the author of Elvis' 1969 number 1 hit "Suspicious Minds".

The song was first released in 1973 as a single, with "For Ol' Times Sake" on the B-side, and then included on the album Raised on Rock / For Ol' Times Sake.

Musical style and lyrics 
The song is sung from the point of view of a person who, as a child in the early years of rock'n'roll, was raised on songs like "Hound Dog" and "Johnny B. Goode" he would listen to on the radio every day.

Charts 
The single "Raised on Rock" / "For Ol' Times Sake" (listed by Billboard as a double-A-sided hit) reached number 41 on the Billboard Hot 100 for the week of October 27, 1973. In addition, the song "Raised on Rock" reached number 27 on the Billboard Easy Listening chart for the week of November 3, 1973.

In the UK Singles Chart, the single "Raised on Rock" reached number 36 for the week of November 24, 1973.

 * Listed as "Raised on Rock / For Ol' Times Sake".

References 

1973 songs
1973 singles
Elvis Presley songs
RCA Records singles
Songs about rock music
Songs written by Mark James (songwriter)